= Poland national football team results =

These are the Poland national football team results and fixtures.

== See also ==
- Poland national football team
